Saint Chrysogonus is a saint and martyr of ancient Rome venerated by the Catholic Church and the Eastern Orthodox Church.

Life
Chrysogonus was martyred at Aquileia, probably during the Diocletianic Persecution (303–311 CE), was buried there, and publicly venerated by the faithful of that region. He is the patron saint of Zadar. His name is found in the Martyrologium Hieronymianum on two different days, 31 May and 24 November, with the topographical note "in Aquileia". 
The name derives from the Ancient Greek “Chrysógonos (Χρυσόγονος)”, composed of the elements: the “khrūsós (χρῡσός)” (golden, gold, something dear or precious) plus “génnēsis (γέννησις)” (birth). Thus the meaning of Chrysogonus is a dear or precious birth.

Very early indeed the veneration of this martyr of Aquileia was transferred to Rome, where in Trastevere a titular church bears his name. This church ("Titulus Chrysogoni") is first mentioned in the signatures of the Roman Synod of 499, but it probably dates from the 4th century. It is possible that the founder of the church was a certain Chrysogonus, and that, on account of the similarity of name, the church was soon devoted to the veneration of the martyr of Aquileia, In a similar way the veneration of Saint Anastasia of Sirmium was transplanted to Rome. It is also possible, however, that from the beginning, for some unknown reason, it was consecrated to Saint Chrysogonus and does take its name from him.

About the 6th century arose a legend of the martyr that made him a Roman and brought him into relation with Saint Anastasia, evidently to explain the veneration of Chrysogonus in the Roman church that bears his name. According to this legend, Chrysogonus, at first a functionary of the vicarius Urbis, was the Christian teacher of Anastasia, the daughter of the noble Roman Praetextatus. Being thrown into prison during the persecution of Diocletian, he comforted by his letters the severely afflicted Anastasia. By order of Diocletian, Chrysogonus was brought before the emperor at Aquileia, condemned to death, and beheaded. His corpse, thrown into the sea, was washed ashore and buried by the aged priest Zoilus who is also the patron saint of Zadar. In the legend the death of the saint is placed on 23 November. The Roman Catholic Church celebrates him on 24 November, the anniversary of the dedication of the church that bears his name. The Eastern Orthodox Church celebrates his feast day on 22 December together with his spiritual daughter Saint Anastasia of Sirmium.

St Chrysogonus is one of the saints mentioned during the Commemoration of the Living in the Roman Canon.

References

External links

 Saint of the Day, November 24: Saint Chrysogonus at SaintPatrickDC.org
 San Crisogono di Aquileia
Martyr Chrysogonus the Teacher of the Greatmartyr Anastasia Orthodox Synaxarion (life of the saint)
Saint Chrysogonus at the Christian Iconography web site
"Here Followeth the Life of S. Grysogone" from the Caxton translation of the Golden Legend

Saints from Roman Italy
4th-century Christian saints
Christians martyred during the reign of Diocletian